"Too Much" is a song by American record producer and DJ Marshmello and Kazakh record producer Imanbek featuring American singer Usher. It was released on October 23, 2020, via Joytime Collective.

Content
The song was written by Marshmello, Imanbek, Khamari Barnes, Nate Cyphert, Vaughn Elsas and Parrish Warrington. According to a press release, "Too Much" is a "high energy" song about "being there for the one you love".

The song is written in the key of F major, with a tempo of 126 beats per minute.

Music video
An accompanying music video was released on October 24, 2020, and directed by Christian Breslauer, who also produced videos for Tiësto, Roddy Ricch, Jason Derulo. The video shows "a virtual-meets-reality world built around the production". In the video, Usher wears VR glasses, and helps "a kidnapped girl from Imanbeck by Marshmello who is remote-controlled by Usher."

Track listing

Charts

Weekly charts

Year-end charts

References

2020 songs
2020 singles
Marshmello songs
Imanbek songs
Usher (musician) songs
Songs written by Marshmello
RCA Records singles